Paramus is a borough in the central portion of Bergen County, in the U.S. state of New Jersey. The Wall Street Journal characterized Paramus as "quintessentially suburban". The borough is also a major commercial hub for North Jersey (home to Garden State Plaza and various corporate headquarters).

As of the 2020 United States census, the borough's population was 26,698, an increase of 356 (+1.4%) from the 2010 census count of 26,342, which in turn reflected an increase of 605 (+2.4%) from the 25,737 counted in the 2000 census.

Paramus was incorporated as a borough by an act of the New Jersey Legislature on March 2, 1922, and ratified by a referendum held on April 4, 1922, that passed by a vote of 238 to 10. Paramus was created from portions of Midland Township, which now exists as Rochelle Park. The borough's name is thought to have originated from the Unami language spoken by the Lenape Native Americans, derived from words meaning "land of the turkeys" or "pleasant stream."

Paramus has some of the most restrictive blue laws in the United States, dating back to the 17th century, banning nearly all white-collar and retail businesses from opening on Sundays except for gas stations, restaurants and grocery stores, and a limited number of other businesses. Despite this, the borough is one of the largest shopping destinations in the country, generating over $6 billion in annual retail sales, more than any other ZIP Code in the United States.

History
The area that ultimately became the present-day North Jersey had been occupied for thousands of years by prehistoric indigenous peoples. At the time of European encounter, it was settled by the Lenape Native Americans. The Lenape language word for the area, Peremessing, which meant that it had an abundant population of wild turkey, was anglicized to become the word "Paramus". A large metal statue of a wild turkey in the Paramus Park mall commemorates this history. Another alternative derivation is that the word means "pleasant stream".

Albert Saboroweski (Albrycht Zaborowski), whose descendants became known by the family name "Zabriskie", immigrated from Poland via the Dutch ship Deb Ves in 1662. He settled in the Dutch West Indies Company town of Ackensack, site of the present-day Hackensack. A son, Jacob, was captured by the Lenape and held for 15 years. When he was returned to his family, the Lenape explained to Saboroweski that they had taken the child in order to teach him their language so that he could serve as a translator.

During the American Revolutionary War, the county included both Loyalists and Patriots, with Patriots "greatly outnumbering" Tories.  Although no major battles were fought in Bergen County, Paramus was part of the military activity, as colonial troops were stationed in Ramapo under the command of Aaron Burr.  In 1777, the British raided the Hackensack area and Burr marched troops to Paramus, where he attacked the British, forcing them to withdraw. General George Washington was in Paramus several times during the War: December 1778; July 1780; and, December 1780.  Following the Battle of Monmouth, Washington established his headquarters in Paramus in July 1778.  Over the advice of his staff, Washington moved his headquarters to Westchester County, New York.

A section of Paramus known as Dunkerhook (meaning dark corner in Dutch) was a free African-American community dating to the early 18th century. Although historical markers on the current site and local oral tradition maintain that this was a slave community, contemporary records document that it was a community of free blacks, not slaves. A group of houses built on Dunkerhook Road by the Zabriskies in the late 18th to early 19th centuries was the center of a community of black farmers, who had been slaves held by the Zabriskie family.

The Arcola Country Club and golf course was created in 1909 and the neighborhood by that name grew around it.

Farview Avenue, located at the highest elevation in Paramus, has a clear view of the Manhattan skyline.

Paramus became one of the "truck farming" areas that helped New Jersey earn its nickname as the "Garden State". By 1940, Paramus' population was just 4,000, with no town center and 94 retail establishments. Although the opening of the George Washington Bridge in 1931 and the widening of Route 17 and Route 4 (which intersect in southern Paramus), made the area accessible to millions, "it was not until the 1950s that massive development hit this section of northern New Jersey".

During the 1950s and 1960s, Paramus, lacking any master plan until 1969, was redeveloped into two shopping corridors when its farmers and outside developers saw that shopping malls were more lucrative than produce farming. "It was a developer's dream: flat cleared land adjacent to major arterials and accessible to a growing suburban population and the country's largest city – with no planning restrictions". New York had a state sales tax, but New Jersey had none, so with the opening of Manhattan department stores in the Bergen Mall (1957), the Garden State Plaza (1957) and Alexander's (1961), Paramus became the "first stop outside New York City for shopping". From 1948 to 1958, the population of Paramus nearly quadrupled, from 6,000 to 23,000, whilw the number of retail establishments tripled from 111 to 319, and annual retail sales increased twenty-fold in nominal dollars, from $5.5 million (equivalent to $ million in ) to $112 million (equal to $ billion in ). By the 1980s, when the population had increased slightly over 1960s levels, retail sales had climbed to $1 billion.

Paramus was the scene of one of the worst COVID-19 outbreaks in the U.S. when an outbreak at the New Jersey Veterans Home resulted in 74 deaths, all former soldiers through May 2020, with some 60% of the home's 314 residents being infected.

Geography
According to the United States Census Bureau, the borough had a total area of 10.51 square miles (27.21 km2), including 10.45 square miles (27.05 km2) of land and 0.06 square miles (0.16 km2) of water (0.60%).

The borough borders the Bergen County municipalities of Emerson, Fair Lawn, Glen Rock, Hackensack, Maywood, Oradell, Ridgewood, River Edge, Rochelle Park, Saddle Brook and Washington Township.

Named neighborhoods within the borough include Arcola, Bergen Place, Dunkerhook, Fairway Oaks, and Spring Valley.

Demographics

2010 census

The Census Bureau's 2006–2010 American Community Survey showed that (in 2010 inflation-adjusted dollars) median household income was $104,986 (with a margin of error of +/− $9,111) and the median family income was $123,848 (+/− $7,952). Males had a median income of $77,325 (+/− $5,222) versus $52,702 (+/− $4,983) for females. The per capita income for the borough was $40,024. About 1.6% of families and 2.8% of the population were below the poverty line, including 3.0% of those under age 18 and 4.1% of those age 65 or over.

Same-sex couples headed 35 households in 2010, more than double the 17 counted in the 2000 census.

2000 census
As of the 2000 United States census there were 25,737 people, 8,082 households, and 6,780 families residing in the borough. The population density was 2,457.7 people per square mile (949.1/km2). There were 8,209 housing units at an average density of 783.9 per square mile (302.7/km2). The racial makeup of the borough was 79.19% White, 1.13% African American, 0.05% Native American, 17.23% Asian, 0.01% Pacific Islander, 0.89% from other races, and 1.51% from two or more races. Hispanic or Latino of any race were 4.87% of the population.

There were 8,082 households, out of which 37.0% had children under the age of 18 living with them, 73.3% were married couples living together, 8.0% had a female householder with no husband present, and 16.1% were non-families. 14.4% of all households were made up of individuals, and 9.4% had someone living alone who was 65 years of age or older. The average household size was 3.00 and the average family size was 3.32.

In the borough the population was spread out, with 23.2% under the age of 18, 5.5% from 18 to 24, 24.7% from 25 to 44, 25.0% from 45 to 64, and 21.5% who were 65 years of age or older. The median age was 43 years. For every 100 females, there were 94.4 males. For every 100 females age 18 and over, there were 90.4 males.

The median income for a household in the borough was $76,918, and the median income for a family was $84,406. Males had a median income of $56,635 versus $37,450 for females. The per capita income for the borough was $29,295. About 1.4% of families and 3.3% of the population were below the poverty line, including 3.4% of those under age 18 and 5.0% of those age 65 or over.

Economy

Corporate headquarters
Paramus was home to the America regional headquarters of Hanjin Shipping, located on the eastbound side of Route 4 before it declared bankruptcy in 2017. Hudson City Bancorp had its headquarters located at West 80 Century Road until its acquisition by M&T Bank, which was completed in 2015. Movado Group Inc. is a watchmaker with its headquarters on From Road. Suez North America, founded as Hackensack Water Company in 1869 and later named United Water, is an American water service company headquartered in Paramus. Coach USA is a large tour operator with its headquarters in Paramus, at the offices of its Community Coach subsidiary. Kristian Regale is a non-alcoholic beverage company based in Paramus.

Paramus was the former headquarters location for Toys "R" Us before the company relocated to Wayne, New Jersey, in 2002 and went bankrupt. Paramus was also the headquarters of Magic Solutions, a defunct computer software company that specialized in help desk automation and asset management software.

Malls

Paramus is known for its multitude of stores and malls. It has five major indoor shopping centers, serving residents in the areas of Bergen County and Passaic County in New Jersey and Rockland County in New York. New Jersey does not levy a sales tax on clothes and shoes, which makes it an attractive shopping destination for people even further away in New York City, who pay sales tax on clothing items above $110 in price, in addition to the lower standard rate of 6.625% in New Jersey, compared to 8.875% in New York City. The borough is one of the largest shopping destinations in the country, generating over $6 billion in annual retail sales, more than any other ZIP Code in the United States despite the county's blue laws.
At the intersection of Routes 4 and 17 is Garden State Plaza, the largest and best-known mall in the borough. On Route 4, are Bergen Town Center (known as the Bergen Mall until 2006),  Paramus Place and The Shoppes on IV. On Route 17, are Paramus Park, Paramus Towne Square, Paramus Design Center, and the Fashion Center.

Many national chain stores have locations in Paramus. Nordstrom's Paramus location was its first New York area store when it opened in September 1990 with strong sales volume. There are 25 retailers that occupy multiple stores in Paramus, including Macy's which had outlets in three malls for a period of time. Some retail analysts view Paramus as being two markets, centered on the two major highways. Lord & Taylor has locations at both Westfield Garden State Plaza and Fashion Center, giving Paramus the distinction of the only town with more than one Lord & Taylor location. Toys "R" Us had two locations: at the Fashion Center, and at a location on the eastbound side of Route 4 near Forest Avenue. Paramus also housed a Babies "R" Us on the northbound side of Route 17, but it closed in 2018. Later that year, the Fashion Center and Route 4 Toys "R" Us locations closed due to the company's bankruptcy. In 1983, Paramus was one of the first locations opening a Kids "R" Us store. When Toys "R" Us was revived in 2019 after emerging from bankruptcy, the first new Toys "R" Us store opened at Garden State Plaza on November 27, 2019. However, it closed again on January 26, 2021, as a result of financial losses caused by the COVID-19 pandemic. H&M has three locations in Paramus: Paramus Park, Westfield Garden State Plaza, and The Outlets at Bergen Town Center.

Blue laws
In addition to the state blue laws that apply to all of Bergen County, Paramus has even stricter restrictions preventing stores selling non-food items from opening on Sundays. These laws were enacted shortly after Garden State Plaza opened out of fear that the mall would cause high levels of congestion in the borough. It is one of the last places in the United States to have such an extensive blue law. This law was called into question when a BJ's Wholesale Club opened at the Routes 4/17 junction. BJ's was allowed to open on Sundays, but is only allowed to sell food and basic necessities. The store has been structured to restrict access to items that cannot be purchased on Sunday.

Local blue laws in Paramus were first proposed in 1957, while the Bergen Mall and Garden State Plaza were under construction. The legislation was motivated by fears that the two new malls would aggravate the already-severe highway congestion caused by local retail businesses along the borough's highways.

The Paramus Borough Code forbids the performance of any "worldly employment" on Sunday, with exceptions for charity, and the sale of newspapers, medicinal drugs, meals, prepared food and cigarettes, among a limited number of exceptions. Even work performed inside one's own home is prohibited on Sunday, though how this could be enforced is questionable. In spite of its six-day shopping week, Paramus consistently has the most retail sales of any ZIP Code in the United States.

More than 63% of Bergen County voters rejected a referendum on the ballot in 1993 that would have repealed the county's blue laws, though the Paramus restrictions would have remained in place. An unsuccessful 2010 proposal by Governor of New Jersey Chris Christie would have ended the state's blue laws (now only enforced in Bergen County), with the governor citing industry estimates that the $1.1 billion in added retail revenue on Sundays would generate an additional $65 million in sales taxes for the state. In November 2012, Governor Chris Christie issued an executive order temporarily suspending the blue laws in both Bergen County and Paramus due to the effects of Hurricane Sandy, a decision that was upheld despite a court challenge by the Borough of Paramus. The blue law suspension was in effect on Sunday, November 11, but was back in effect the following Sunday.

Timeline of malls and shopping centers
 1963 – Paramus Place was built on the north side of Route 4 across from Bergen Mall.
 1967 – The Fashion Center was built on a  site of old celery farms, aimed at quality-oriented shoppers by developer Associated Dry Goods, with a  Lord & Taylor and a  B. Altman as anchors and 25 other retailers sandwiched in between The owners originally referred to its location as being in Ridgewood/Paramus to appeal to the Ridgewood population.
 1972 – The 35 Plaza Shopping Center is built on Route 4, just located 2 minutes away from Paramus Place.
 1998 – The Paramus Towne Square opened up and was built on the north side of Route 17.
 2003 – IKEA opens a  store, its second-largest location in North America, at the intersection of Routes 4 and 17 on the site of the old Alexander's department store. However, when Sports Authority went out of business in 2016, the  store was closed.
 2015 – The Paramus Design Center opens up on the northbound side of Route 17.
 2018 – The Paramus Crossroads shopping center, located on the southbound side of Route 17, officially opened in summer 2018.

Due to the stricter version of the blue laws in Paramus, malls (and almost all retail establishments) in the borough are closed on Sunday except for restaurants and other exempted establishments. Stores may not open before 7:00 AM or remain open after 11:00 PM.

Arts and culture
One of the earliest drive-in theaters opened in Paramus, featuring what was said to be the world's largest and brightest screen, located behind what is now Westfield Garden State Plaza. The Paramus Drive-In closed in 1987 after the last movie presentation, a double-feature of "Crocodile" Dundee and The Untouchables.

Currently, Paramus' lone movie theater complex is a 16-screen AMC Theatres located in an area of new construction at Westfield Garden State Plaza. Prior to the opening of the AMC complex, a number of theatres were closed in the borough, including the Route 4 Tenplex and the Cineplex Odeon Route 17 Triplex, once located next to Westfield Garden State Plaza on Route 17. The Triplex and Tenplex theatres was opened on October 12, 1965, by Century Theatres and was closed on May 24, 2007, by Loews Cineplex Entertainment. On May 25, 2007, the new AMC Theatres opened at Westfield Garden State Plaza. The Paramus Picture Show, known as Cinema 35 until 1997, closed in December 2004 in the wake of declining attendance. A 12-screen Regal Cinemas was planned to open at Paramus Park as part of renovations that would have replaced the Sears store with a Stew Leonard's location. However, the plans were cancelled after Stew Leonard's took up more space than expected.

The Bergen Town Center had a performing arts theater called "Playhouse on the Mall". It had a seating capacity of 635 seats and was opened in 1960. From 1960 to 1970, author Robert Ludlum was the manager of the theater. The theater closed in 1982 due to rising costs and low attendance and was converted into retail space in 1986.

In 2016, the Garden State Plaza added a Bergen Performing Arts Center performance area for shows and performances located near Macy's, which took up the former space of the Venetian carousel. There was also a Bergen PAC ticket center located near the performance area. The Bergen PAC performance area, however, was short lived as it was replaced by a video game theater, then it became a lounge area in 2017.

The glam metal band, Trixter, formed in Paramus. The hardcore/punk rock band The Escape Engine formed in the borough from 2002 to 2006.

Parks and recreation

Paramus is the home to two county parks. On the eastern side of the borough is Van Saun County Park, a  park that features Bergen County's only zoo, home to a wide variety of wild and domestic animals living in recreated habitats natural to each species. Van Saun Park also has a playground, train ride, carousel, athletic fields, and pony rides. The Washington Spring site in the park takes its name from reports that General Washington drank water from the spring here while his troops were encamped nearby, west of the Hackensack River. The Continental Army is reported to have utilized the old spring at the base of these slopes during the September encampment west of the Hackensack River.

On the western side of the borough is Saddle River County Park which features a  bike path reaching from Ridgewood to Rochelle Park.

The borough has four golf courses. Two are open to the public, with the Paramus Golf Course operated by the borough and Orchard Hills County Golf Course operated by the county. The two private golf course located in Paramus are the Ridgewood Country Club and Arcola Country Club.  Ridgewood Country Club was ranked as the  #6 Center Ranked Among Top 500 Holes in the World Golf Magazine – 2000 and Ranked # 84 on the list of Most Prestigious Clubs in America Golf Connoisseur – 2006.

In 2008, the Paramus Golf Course opened a miniature golf course that is themed after the borough of Paramus as well as the state of New Jersey. Turkey statues are scattered around the course to celebrate Paramus as the "land of the wild turkeys."

Paramus has an outdoor municipal swimming pool complex on Van Binsberger Boulevard.  It has three pools: a main pool, a pool for younger swimmers, and a baby pool. Paramus Little League were the 2011 New Jersey State Little League Baseball Champions.

Arcola Park was an outdoor amusement park built in 1926. It had a huge swimming pool, a convention hall, a dance pavilion, an auditorium, and rides. A fire in 1929 destroyed the entire park, with the exception of the pool. The pool was destroyed by another fire in 1970 and closed down for good. The park site was replaced by a Ramada Inn, the hotel extending into a small portion of Rochelle Park.

Annual events

During the week of the 4th of July, Paramus holds its own Independence Day celebration. First, there is the performance of the Paramus Community Orchestra at the Paramus Bandshell which takes place on July 2. Next, on the 3rd, there is a softball game between the Paramus Fire Department and the Paramus Police Department, held annually since 2011. On the 4th, there is a parade. The parade route starts at the intersection of Century Road and Farview Avenue and ends at Memorial Elementary School. On the 5th, there is a fireworks display at the Cliff Gennarelli Paramus Sportsplex.

Paramus also holds its own Memorial Day parade every year.

Paramus hosts an annual National Night Out. The event typically includes games and activities as well as a concert. The borough's fire, rescue, police, and ambulance vehicles are also displayed.

The Paramus Rescue Squad and Fire Department Companies 2 & 3 host a Halloween party every October called, "Safe Halloween" to ensure every child has a safe and fun Halloween.

The Paramus Fire Department also has its annual "Santa Detail" every December. The fire department drives throughout the borough on the Sunday before Christmas with Santa riding atop the fire apparatus. Members of the department accompany Santa and give out lollipops to residents who come outside during the tour.

Government

Local government
Paramus is governed under the Borough form of New Jersey municipal government, which is used in 218 municipalities (of the 564) statewide, making it the most common form of government in New Jersey. The governing body is comprised of a Mayor and a Borough Council, with all positions elected at-large on a partisan basis as part of the November general election. A Mayor is elected directly by the voters to a four-year term of office. The Borough Council is comprised of six members elected to serve three-year terms on a staggered basis, with two seats coming up for election each year in a three-year cycle. The Borough form of government used by Paramus is a "weak mayor / strong council" government in which council members act as the legislative body with the mayor presiding at meetings and voting only in the event of a tie. The mayor can veto ordinances subject to an override by a two-thirds majority vote of the council. The mayor makes committee and liaison assignments for council members, and most appointments are made by the mayor with the advice and consent of the council.

, the Mayor is Republican Christopher DiPiazza, whose term of office ends December 31, 2026. Borough Council members are Council President Jeanne T. Weber (R, 2025), Ace A. Antonio (R, 2024), Maria Elena Bellinger (D, 2023), Robert Kaiser (R, 2024), Al Nadera (R, 2023; appointed to serve an unexpired term) and Jorge E. Quintana (R, 2025).
In February 2023, the borough council appointed Al Nadera to fill the seat expiring in December 2023 that became vacant when Chris DiPiazza took office as mayor.

In October 2015, Moody's Investors Service upgraded general obligation debt of the Borough of Paramus from Aa1 to Aaa, in light of the low levels of debt and the strength of the borough's financial operations, reserve levels, tax base, management practices and levels of wealth.

Federal, state and county representation
Paramus is located in the 5th Congressional District and is part of New Jersey's 38th state legislative district.

Politics
As of March 2011, there were a total of 16,874 registered voters in Paramus, of which 4,454 (26.4% vs. 31.7% countywide) were registered as Democrats, 3,474 (20.6% vs. 21.1%) were registered as Republicans and 8,938 (53.0% vs. 47.1%) were registered as Unaffiliated. There were 8 voters registered as Libertarians or Greens. Among the borough's 2010 Census population, 64.1% (vs. 57.1% in Bergen County) were registered to vote, including 81.6% of those ages 18 and over (vs. 73.7% countywide).

In the 2016 presidential election, Republican Donald Trump received 6,565 votes (49.5% vs. 41.1% countywide), ahead of Democrat Hillary Clinton with 6,312 votes (47.6% vs. 54.2%) and other candidates with 389 votes (2.9% vs. 4.6%), among the 13,434 ballots cast by the borough's 18,526 registered voters, for a turnout of 72.5% (vs. 72.5% in Bergen County). In the 2012 presidential election, Republican Mitt Romney received 6,123 votes here (50.0% vs. 43.5% countywide), ahead of Democrat Barack Obama with 5,907 votes (48.3% vs. 54.8%) and other candidates with 105 votes (0.9% vs. 0.9%), among the 12,234 ballots cast by the borough's 17,617 registered voters, for a turnout of 69.4% (vs. 70.4% in Bergen County). In the 2008 presidential election, Republican John McCain received 6,885 votes here (51.1% vs. 44.5% countywide), ahead of Democrat Barack Obama with 6,386 votes (47.4% vs. 53.9%) and other candidates with 106 votes (0.8% vs. 0.8%), among the 13,470 ballots cast by the borough's 17,747 registered voters, for a turnout of 75.9% (vs. 76.8% in Bergen County). In the 2004 presidential election, Republican George W. Bush received 6,868 votes here (52.3% vs. 47.2% countywide), ahead of Democrat John Kerry with 6,103 votes (46.5% vs. 51.7%) and other candidates with 87 votes (0.7% vs. 0.7%), among the 13,123 ballots cast by the borough's 17,206 registered voters, for a turnout of 76.3% (vs. 76.9% in the whole county).

In the 2013 gubernatorial election, Republican Chris Christie received 64.4% of the vote (4,888 cast), ahead of Democrat Barbara Buono with 34.8% (2,641 votes), and other candidates with 0.8% (60 votes), among the 7,809 ballots cast by the borough's 17,083 registered voters (220 ballots were spoiled), for a turnout of 45.7%. In the 2009 gubernatorial election, Republican Chris Christie received 4,298 votes here (49.7% vs. 45.8% countywide), ahead of Democrat Jon Corzine with 3,857 votes (44.6% vs. 48.0%), Independent Chris Daggett with 376 votes (4.3% vs. 4.7%) and other candidates with 32 votes (0.4% vs. 0.5%), among the 8,656 ballots cast by the borough's 17,354 registered voters, yielding a 49.9% turnout (vs. 50.0% in the county).

Education
The Paramus Public Schools serve students in pre-kindergarten through twelfth grade. As of the 2019–20 school year, the eight-school district had an enrollment of 3,760 students and 332.7 classroom teachers (on an FTE basis), for a student–teacher ratio of 11.3:1. Schools in the district, with 2019–20 enrollment data from the National Center for Education Statistics, are 
Memorial Elementary School (302 students in grades K–4), 
Midland Elementary School (177 students in grades K–4), 
Parkway Elementary School (314 students in grades Pre-K–4), 
Ridge Ranch Elementary School (337 students in grades K–4), 
Stony Lane Elementary School (186 students in grades K–4), 
East Brook Middle School (575 students in grades 5–8), 
West Brook Middle School (577 students in grades 5–8) and 
Paramus High School (1,253 students in grades 9–12).

Three of the district's schools have been formally recognized with the National Blue Ribbon School Award of Excellence: Paramus High School in 1988–1989, Parkway Elementary School in 1987–1988 and Ridge Ranch Elementary School in 1998–1999.

Public school students from the borough, and all of Bergen County, are eligible to attend the secondary education programs offered by the Bergen County Technical Schools, which include the Bergen County Academies in Hackensack, and the Bergen Tech campus in Teterboro or Bergen Tech campus in Paramus. The district offers programs on a shared-time or full-time basis, with admission based on a selective application process and tuition covered by the student's home school district.

Paramus is home to many private religious schools. Paramus Catholic High School is a co-educational Roman Catholic high school founded in 1965 and operated by the Archdiocese of Newark. With more than 1,500 students, it has the largest enrollment of any Roman Catholic high school in the state of New Jersey. It is also the location of Visitation Academy, a Pre-K3–8 Catholic school also overseen by the Newark Archdiocese.

K–8 co-ed Jewish day schools in Paramus include Yavneh Academy; Yeshivat Noam, founded in 2001; and Ben Porat Yosef, which was established in 2001 and relocated to Paramus in 2008. Frisch School is a Modern Orthodox Jewish yeshiva serving grades 9–12 that describes itself as the nation's second-largest coed yeshiva high school.

Bergen Community College is based in Paramus, with other satellite centers located around the county. The bulk of the college's 17,000 students working towards degrees are located at the main campus in Paramus. The Bergen campus of Berkeley College is located in Paramus. There is also a DeVry University campus located at the 35 Plaza Shopping Center in Paramus. There is a Lincoln Tech campus at Bergen Town Center.

Paramus is home to four special education schools. New Alliance Academy, located on Midland Ave, provides educational and ancillary therapeutic services for high school teenagers experiencing acute psychological distress. The EPIC School (Educational Partnership for Instructing Children) is located on North Farview Avenue, next to the Our Lady of Visitation Church. The Alpine Learning Group is located on County Route 62, close to Linwood Avenue, and P.R.I.D.E. School, which is a part of the ECLC school, which serves three other locations in New Jersey, has a location on Sette Drive. The Bergen County Special Services School District, which provides public special education services on a countywide basis, is headquartered in Paramus.

Public library
The borough's public library maintains two locations—the Main Library on Century Road and the Charles E. Reid Branch library on Midland Avenue, which was originally a four-room schoolhouse built in 1876.

The borough's original public library, known locally as the Howland House, was originally located at the intersection of Spring Valley Road and Howland Avenue.  It was demolished sometime in the late 1990s.  A September 11, 2001 memorial park now exists at the site known as Howland Memorial Grove.

Healthcare 
 Atlantic Health System Paramus Pavillion – located at Paramus Park in the former Sears Auto Center. This facility offers services such as physical therapy and rehabilitation services. 
 New Bridge Medical Center – located at 230 East Ridgewood Avenue, this medical center is a 1,070-bed hospital that is a clinical affiliate of Rutgers Biomedical and Health Sciences. It was founded in 1916 and is the largest hospital and licensed nursing home in the entire state of New Jersey.
 Oradell Animal Hospital – located on Winters Avenue, across from Paramus Park, this facility provides medical care and treatments for all animals.
 Paramus has a St. Joseph's Regional Medical Center campus located on Century Road.
 The Valley Hospital has a health and fitness center on the southbound side of Route 17 and is specialized in recovery physical therapy. Valley Hospital also has support offices at the Kraft Center, located on 15 Essex Avenue. In addition, the Luckow Pavilion, located at 1 Valley Health Plaza, near the Fashion Center, specializes in cancer treatment, fertility, gamma knife surgery, and pharmacy.

Transportation

Roads and highways

Highways in Paramus include Route 17, Route 4 and the Garden State Parkway (including the Paramus Toll Plaza at Interchange 165).

Public transportation
NJ Transit bus routes 144, 145, 148, 155, 157, 162, 163, 164, 165 and 168 serve the Port Authority Bus Terminal in Midtown Manhattan; the 171 and 175 routes provide service to the George Washington Bridge Bus Station; and local service is offered on the 709, 722, 751, 752, 753, 755, 756, 758, 762 and 770 routes. Nine of the 22 NJ Transit buses that serve Paramus do not provide service on Sundays. The 722 does not provide services on Saturdays and Sundays.

Coach USA provides bus service to the Port Authority Bus Terminal via Rockland Coaches routes 45/45A/45X from Pomona, New York, and via Short Line on Route 17.

Spanish Transportation and several other operators provide frequent jitney service along Route 4 between Paterson, New Jersey, and the George Washington Bridge Bus Station.

Points of interest

Historic sites

Paramus is home to the following locations on the National Register of Historic Places:
 Easton Tower – Intersection of Red Mill Road and Paramus Road (added 2007). The tower was built in 1899 and was originally housed as a water pump that sits alongside the Saddle River. The tower was named after businessman Edward D. Easton.
 Midland School – 239 W. Midland Avenue (added 1978). The school was constructed in 1876, and was used as a branch of the Paramus Public Library after Midland School was moved.
 Terhune House – 470 Paramus Road (added 1996). An 18th-century Dutch Colonial home constructed of sandstone, that was later modified to add Victorian features, including a mansard roof.
 Terhune-Gardner-Lindenmeyr House – 218 Paramus Road (added 1972). A Federal Period home constructed on the last remaining portion of untouched land from Terhune's farm, as taken from the original Zabriskie patent. The oldest known portion that can be reliably dated is from 1807 to 1808, with an older adjoining section of the house dating back as far as 1707.
 Harmon Van Dien House – 449 Paramus Road (added 1983).
 Albert J. Zabriskie Farmhouse – 7 East Ridgewood Avenue (added 1977).
 Zabriskie Tenant House – 273 Dunkerhook Road (added 1984). The house was demolished in July 2012 by a housing developer who owned the property, after efforts to preserve or relocate the house failed.

Other points of interest
 Buehler Challenger and Science Center, located on the campus of Bergen Community College, is a space museum where children learn about outer space and missions through simulations. The science center is also available to adults and educators.
 Fritz Behnke Historical Museum, located on Paramus Road. It is open every Sunday and has exhibits about Paramus' past.
 New Jersey Children's Museum. Opened in 1992, it featured hands-on exhibits for children such as a fire truck, a news studio, a helicopter, and other fun pretend attractions that drew 700,000 visitors per year. It closed in 2014 after Valley Hospital bought the property near its Ridgewood location.

Emergency services

Fire/rescue services
The Paramus Fire Department is a volunteer fire department that has a total of about 130 members who are on call around-the-clock, 365 days a year.  Over the last several years, the number of calls for service that the fire department has responded to averages about 1,300 calls per year.  The mission of the Paramus Fire Department is to protect the lives and property of the community.  The fire department comprises four fire companies:

Fire Company 1 (Engine 1 and Ladder Truck 1) is located at East Firehouse Lane, across from the Fashion Center.
Fire Company 2 (Engine 2 and Engine 22-a spare) is located on Spring Valley Road, and is nicknamed "Spring Valley Fire Company #2."
Fire Company 3 (Engine 3,  HazMat 3 – staffed by HazMat Technicians from all four fire companies, Utility 3, and Foam 3 – which carries AFFF firefighting foam) is located at 198 West Midland Avenue.
Fire Company 4 (Engine 4, Ladder Truck 4, and Engine 44 – a mini-pumper) is on Farview Avenue, and is nicknamed "Farview Fire Company #4."

Paramus also has a separate volunteer rescue squad (Rescue 7 & Rescue 9) located on West Jockish Square that specializes in motor vehicle extrication, as well as a marine unit for responses involving water rescues.

Ambulance and police
The borough's Emergency Medical Services department is staffed 24 hours a day. A separate volunteer Ambulance Corps exists, largely for stand-by purposes at large events. The Volunteer Ambulance Corps station is located on East Midland Avenue. The Paramus Police Department, which responds to 60,000 calls annually, is located on Carlough Drive right next to borough hall.

Emergency management
The borough of Paramus has an emergency management department that is required by state and law to develop emergency plans to protect people and property in the event of any emergency or disaster. The Emergency Management offices are located on Carlough Drive in the Paramus Life Safety Complex next to borough hall, the police department, and the rescue squad.

In popular culture
 Rock band Black Sabbath made stops in Paramus during their Paranoid Tour in 1970 and 1971.
 Rockapella, the a cappella group best known for performing on the children's game show Where in The World Is Carmen Sandiego?, had their first public gig at the former Bamberger's store (currently Macy's) at Garden State Plaza on October 11, 1986, after performing at a private party in Oradell six months earlier.
The 1993 Saturday Night Live spin-off movie Coneheads is set in Paramus. Dan Aykroyd and Jane Curtin's characters decide to move to and permanently reside in the borough so daughter Michelle Burke can attend Paramus High School. Aykroyd's character "Beldar Conehead" spends his days in Paramus giving driving lessons and playing golf.
Scenes from the 2008 film Burn After Reading by the Coen Brothers were filmed in Paramus at the site of the old Tower Records annex building located on Route 17S that had been transformed into Hardbodies Fitness Center.
A scene from the 1996 film Ransom was filmed on Route 4 in Paramus where Mullen is driving to Stone Quarry.
Paramus was one of the filming locations in the 1986 film Something Wild.
 Several episodes of the HBO crime drama The Sopranos used Paramus locations. Throughout the series, Garden State Plaza and the Ramsey Outdoor store on Route 17 were both featured, and a character was "whacked" at the remnants of the Old Mill Bathing Beach on Paramus Road. In the series finale, a scene with Paulie Gualtieri was filmed in Paramus, in which he drove past a gas station.
 The 2005 Sesame Street direct-to-video All Star Alphabet, featuring Stephen Colbert and Nicole Sullivan, was filmed on location at Garden State Plaza.
 The former Paramus Bowling Center was the filming site of the bowling competition shows Make That Spare and Championship Bowling.
 Hanson's 1997 video "Tulsa, Tokyo & the Middle of Nowhere", features the band travelling to Paramus Park on May 7, 1997, performing in the food court in front of 600 screaming fans. The performance was their first public appearance after the release of "MMMBop".
Garden State Plaza is the setting for Tricia Sullivan's science fiction novel Maul (2002). The novel takes its title from the way that the word "mall" is pronounced with the New Jersey accent. In the novel, three teenage girls start a shoot out with a local gang.
American ska punk band Less Than Jake has a song entitled 24 Hours in Paramus on their 1995 album Losers, Kings and Things We Don't Understand.
 The ABC situational hidden camera show, What Would You Do? filmed some episodes in Paramus at the Tom Sawyer Diner.

Notable people

People who were born in, residents of, or otherwise closely associated with Paramus include:

 John Bancker Aycrigg (1798–1856), member of the United States Congress from New Jersey
 Joe Benigno (born 1953), sports radio personality on WFAN on Joe & Evan show with Evan Roberts
 Chase Blackburn (born 1983), linebacker for the New York Giants and a member of the Super Bowl XLII and Super Bowl XLVI champion Giants
 Juwann Bushell-Beatty (born 1996), offensive lineman for the Ottawa Redblacks of the Canadian Football League
 Galit Chait (born 1975), ice dancer who represented Israel internationally from 1995 to 2006
 Lizabeth Cohen (born 1952), historian, college professor and author, whose 2003 work A Consumer's Republic builds on her experience growing up in post-war Paramus
 Joseph Coniglio (born 1943), former member of the New Jersey Senate
 Paul Contillo (born 1929), politician who served in both houses of the New Jersey Legislature after serving on the Paramus Borough Council from 1971 to 1973
 Stacey Dash (born 1967), film and television actress who appeared in the 1995 film Clueless and its TV spinoff
 Spero Dedes (born 1979), Los Angeles Lakers radio commentator, NFL Network television host, and CBS NCAA tournament basketball announcer
 Bill DeMott (born 1966), retired professional wrestler and road agent best known for his appearances with World Championship Wrestling as Hugh Morrus and World Wrestling Federation/Entertainment under his real name
 Jim Dray (born 1986), tight end who has played for the Arizona Cardinals
 Warren Farrell (born 1943), educator, gender equality activist and author
 Fat Joe (born 1970), rapper, actor, CEO of Terror Squad Entertainment, and member of musical groups D.I.T.C. and Terror Squad
 Mark Fields (born ), former Ford Motor Company President and Chief Executive Officer
 Dean Friedman (born 1955), one-hit wonder with the top tune "Ariel" in 1977, which includes lyrics mentioning "the waterfall in Paramus Park"
 Fred C. Galda (–1997), former mayor of Paramus who oversaw the implementation of the borough's blue laws in 1958
 Peter Gennaro (1919–2000), Tony Award-winning dancer and choreographer
 Matt Ghaffari (born 1961), Olympic wrestler
 Jamie Gold (born 1969), winner of the 2006 World Series of Poker
 Victoria Herrmann, polar geographer and climate change communicator
 Matt Hunter (born 1998), singer, songwriter and voice actor
 Charles Samuel Joelson (1916–1999), politician who represented New Jersey's 8th congressional district
 Louis F. Kosco (born 1932), politician who served in both the New Jersey General Assembly and the New Jersey Senate
 Joseph Lagana (born 1978), member of the New Jersey Senate since 2018
 Lloyd Levin (born 1958), film producer whose work includes United 93
 Tony Lip (1930–2013), actor who appeared on The Sopranos, playing the role of Carmine Lupertazzi, and whose story was dramatized in the Oscar-winning film Green Book
 Howard Lorber (born 1948), CEO of the Vector Group
 Herbert F. Maddalene (born 1928), architect best known for his work designing churches with the firm of Genovese & Maddalene
 Trisha Meili, the "Central Park jogger", a 28-year-old woman who was raped and beaten while jogging in New York City's Central Park in 1989
 Bob Menendez (born 1954), U.S. Senator
 Liv Morgan (born 1994), professional wrestler
 Dean Obeidallah (born 1969), Arab/Italian-American comedian
 George Olsen (1893–1971), bandleader and proprietor of Olsen's Restaurant in the 1950s and 1960s
 Ken Oringer (born 1965), chef
 John Bartow Prevost (1766–1825), first Judge of the Superior Court of the Territory of Orleans
 John Robertson (born 1993), quarterback for the Villanova Wildcats football team who won the 2014 Walter Payton Award
 Ira Rubin (1930–2013), world champion professional contract bridge player
 Gary Stein (born 1933), attorney and former Associate Justice on the New Jersey Supreme Court, who served for 17 years where he wrote over 365 published opinions
 Nick Suriano (born 1997), freestyle and folkstyle wrestler, NCAA wrestling champion at Rutgers and Michigan
 Kazbek Tambi (born 1961), former professional soccer player
 Steven H. Temares (born 1958), Chief Executive Officer of Bed, Bath & Beyond
 Theodore Trautwein (1920–2000), judge who sentenced a reporter from The New York Times to 40 days in jail in the "Dr. X" trial of Mario Jascalevich
 Connie Wagner (born 1948), member of the New Jersey General Assembly from 2008 to 2013
 Yoojin Grace Wuertz (born 1980), novelist who wrote the 2017 book Everything Belongs To Us
 Elaine Zayak (born 1965), one of the world's top figure skaters in the early 1980s

References

Citations

General sources 
 Municipal Incorporations of the State of New Jersey (according to Counties) prepared by the Division of Local Government, Department of the Treasury (New Jersey); December 1, 1958.
 Behnke, Fritz. Paramus: The Way We Were 1922–1960, Destiny Image Publishers, 1997. .
 Clayton, W. Woodford; and Nelson, William. History of Bergen and Passaic Counties, New Jersey, with Biographical Sketches of Many of its Pioneers and Prominent Men., Philadelphia: Everts and Peck, 1882.
 Harvey, Cornelius Burnham (ed.), Genealogical History of Hudson and Bergen Counties, New Jersey. New York: New Jersey Genealogical Publishing Co., 1900.
 Van Valen, James M. History of Bergen County, New Jersey. New York: New Jersey Publishing and Engraving Co., 1900.
 Westervelt, Frances A. History of Bergen County, New Jersey, 1630–1923, Lewis Historical Publishing Company, 1923.

External links

 Paramus official website

 
1922 establishments in New Jersey
Borough form of New Jersey government
Boroughs in Bergen County, New Jersey
Populated places established in 1922